HMS Mary Galley was a 44-gun fifth rate ship of the line, built and launched in 1744 in Rotherhithe, and sunk as a breakwater in 1764.

Naval service
Mary Galley was initially commissioned under Captain Piercy Brett, but command was transferred to Captain William Dandridge before the ship was put to sea. Dandridge died on 27 August, and command passed to Robert Swanton. Under Swanton, Mary Galley undertook an extensive voyage of patrol along the Bristol Channel, the Downs and into the North Sea. In March 1746 she underwent minor repairs at Sheerness docks at a cost of £984.

The ship returned to sea in April 1746 and was assigned to Atlantic service off west Africa, and then to the Leeward Islands from 1747 to 1748. She was surveyed for hull damage in January 1749, but no repairs were made. She was sunk as part of a breakwater at Plymouth, on 20 April 1764.

References

1744 ships
Ships built on the River Thames
Ships sunk as breakwaters
Maritime incidents in 1764